Charles A. Johnson Jr., known as J.R. Johnson (born June 20, 1979) is a former American football linebacker who played one season in the National Football League (NFL) for the Baltimore Ravens and New Orleans Saints. He was signed as an undrafted free agent in 2002 by Baltimore and also had stints with the Seattle Seahawks, Indianapolis Colts, Carolina Panthers, Oakland Raiders and Atlanta Falcons.

Early life
J.R. Johnson was born on June 20, 1979 in Los Angeles, California. He went to high school at Cicero–North Syracuse. In his high school career, he had 2,870 yards and 50 touchdowns. He also had 9 interceptions and 221 tackles.

High school awards and honors
SuperPrep All-American (1996)
Grid Iron All-Star (1996)
First-team All-Central New York (1996)
Regional Elite Team (1996)
Top 50 Athletes in New York (1996)

College career
Johnson went to college at Syracuse. He was redshirted in 1997, in 1998, his freshmen year, he played in 9 games. He had 16 tackles in the season. The next year he played in 8 games, he had 16 tackles. In 1999, he had 60 tackles and a sack in 10 games. He had 44 tackles in 2001.

Career college statistics

College Awards and Honors
1x BIG EAST Special Teams player of the week

Professional career

Baltimore Ravens
J.R. Johnson was signed as a undrafted free agent on April 25, 2002 by the Baltimore Ravens. He played in four games for the Ravens. He had 4 tackles. He also had one penalty. He was released on October 14.

New Orleans Saints
One day after being released, he was signed by the New Orleans Saints. He played in one game for them. He was waived on December 8.

Seattle Seahawks
The day after he was waived, he was claimed by the Seattle Seahawks. He was waived two days later.

Indianapolis Colts
On January 7, 2003, he was signed by the Indianapolis Colts. He was released on August 26.

Carolina Panthers
He was later signed by the Carolina Panthers, but he did not play in any games.

Oakland Raiders
On November 19, he was signed by the Oakland Raiders. He was released on December 16. The Raiders were his 6th team in 2 years.

Atlanta Falcons
He was signed on January 19, 2004, by the Atlanta Falcons. He was released on May 18. The Falcons were his last team.

Personal life
His brother Curtis Johnson played in the NFL also. He was a defensive end and linebacker.

References

1979 births
Living people
Players of American football from Los Angeles
American football linebackers
Syracuse Orange football players
Baltimore Ravens players
New Orleans Saints players